The British Boy Scouts and British Girl Scouts Association (BBS & BGS Association; also known as The Brotherhood of British Scouts) is an early scouting organisation, having begun as the Battersea Boy Scouts in 1908. The organisation was renamed as the British Boy Scouts and launched as a national organisation on 24 May 1909. In association with other Scout organisations, the BBS formed the National Peace Scouts in 1910. The BBS instigated the first international Scouting organisation, the Order of World Scouts in 1911.

History

British Boy Scouts

The British Boy Scouts was founded in 1908 as the Battersea Boy Scouts, a local association of Scout troops. The Battersea Boy Scouts later briefly registered with Baden-Powell's Boy Scouts organisation but, in 1909, withdrew and formed the British Boy Scouts (BBS), out of a concern that Baden-Powell's organisation was too bureaucratic and militaristic and too closely associated with commercial interests. Initially, the BBS was led by Major W.G. Whitby as Chief Commissioner and as financier. Assisting were Colonel Frederick Charles Keyser, President BBS and H. Moore secretary of the Battersea Boy Scouts. The BBS was launched as a national organisation on Empire Day, 24 May 1909.

The BBS was given publicity by Cassell and Company publisher of CHUMS publication, who had previously developed their own league of 'CHUMS league of Scouts' with the CHUMS Scout Patrols. They were formed by the readers of the CHUMS boy's newspaper, in response to an invitation from the editor for boys to form their own patrols. Cassell merged their patrols with the BBS and allowed them to publish a weekly page June 1909 until mid-1911.

CHUMS "On the Watch Tower" news column reported on 11 September 1907 that Robert Baden-Powell's Brownsea Island Scouting encampment was proposed and his recommendation that Boy Scout groups should be formed.  Readers were interested in forming Scouting groups and the editorial staff initially supported this move, indicating that Baden-Powell would be consulted.  The CHUMS Scouts would wear the 'Chums' League badge. The CHUMS newspaper was distributed throughout the British Empire and CHUMS Scout Patrols formed in both the UK and Australia 1908. Due to Baden-Powell's arrangement with his publisher, Pearson, CHUMS was denied the rights to publish the Scout scheme in what was a rival paper.  Later, CHUMS indicated that there would be a CHUMS Legion of Scouts formed from the CHUMS Scout Patrols to be announced later. Instead CHUMS announced the launch of British Boy Scouts (BBS) and that it would be the official BBS journal in May 1909.

Sir Francis Vane was appointed as the first London Commissioner of the Baden-Powell Boy Scouts organisation.  Vane believed that Scouting should be non-military and through mediation, reconciled the British Boy Scouts(BBS) with the B–P organisation, by having the BBS as an affiliated organisation.  With Vane pushing for a more democratic organisation, his position was eliminated by Baden-Powell's headquarter staff.  In a protest meeting, the London area Scoutmasters voted overwhelming in support of Sir Francis Vane. However Baden-Powell, even though he promised to do so, never reinstated Vane. Members of the National Service League, a pro-military group, were appointed to the Baden-Powell Boy Scouts headquarters. On 3 December 1909, Vane accepted the presidency of the British Boy Scouts taking most London area Troops with him. The Quakers' Birmingham and Midland Troops also followed as Vane was a key influence in getting the Quakers to sponsor Scout Troops.

With the spread of the alternative British Boy Scouts program throughout the world via the CHUMS publication and Vane's efforts, Vane informally aligned the various groups as the Legion of World Scouts, the first international organisation. In 1911 this was formally launched as the Order of World Scouts (OWS).

By mid-1911, the original organisers had resigned from the BBS, losing the organisation sponsorship from CHUMS. Vane put his wealth behind the organisation, providing a London headquarters and financed the organisation, including the manufacture of BBS uniforms. This overburdened his finances to the point of him declaring bankruptcy. Thus the British Boy Scouts and the Order of World Scouts lost their headquarters, source of equipment and uniforms and their leader, Sir Francis Vane. By the end of 1912 Captain Masterman, then Assistant Grand Scoutmaster – Britain, led Troops and Junior Troops in joining The Boy Scouts Association while in 1913 some troops were led by Mr. Barrow Cadbury to join the Boys' Life Brigade (BLB), becoming the BLB Scouts.  This left about 100 Troops under the new Grand Scoutmaster, Albert Jones Knighton.  Vane kept in contact, and in 1915, home from leave from his duties for the Army in Ireland, inspected a Troop under London Commissioner, Mr Percy Herbert Pooley.  Under Knighton and Pooley, the BBS & BGS became a definite Christian association.

The UK Parliament had a bill in 1921 before it to restrict use of "Boy Scout" and Scout uniform and Badges to The Boy Scouts Association but the measure failed. In 1926, a broader bill to protect all Chartered Associations was passed but with a clause by Herbert Dunnico, a Labour MP and a BBS Scoutmaster, that exempted any 'bona fide national organisation' from the act, such as the British Boy Scouts. Knighton had resigned without waiting for the outcome of the legislation and formed "the British Boy Sentinels", a non-Scouting organisation. Pooley took over as Chief Commissioner with Rt Hon. Lord Alington as Grand Scoutmaster.  Some former Boy Scouts Association registered Troops from Shoreditch, East Ham and Lewisham allied with the BBS until 1932 forming 'The Independent Scout Alliance'. Some BLB Companies affiliated with the BBS as the 'Young Life Pioneers' when in 1926 the Life Brigade merged with the Boys' Brigade.  Sir Francis in vain tried to reconcile the BBS with The Boy Scouts Association after returning from Italy in 1927. This initiative failed due to a lack of a positive response from the B–P HQ. They required the BBS to disband, and Troops and individuals apply in the normal way – without any reassurance as to the acceptance of units.

Brotherhood of British Scouts
The Young Life Pioneers by 1930's either joined the Boys' Brigade or became BBS Troops. About 40 Troops existed in the 1930s mostly sponsored by Free Churches. With reduced membership and lacking a Parliamentarian supporter, the Boy Scout Association used "The Chartered Associations (Protection of Names and Uniforms) Act" to stop the BBS from using the term "Boy Scouts" which prompted a change in name to "The Brotherhood of British Scouts" to avoid any further legal action. In response some Yorkshire and Nottinghamshire Troops under the Assistant Chief Commissioner W. Hanley broke off from the main group using "British Boy Scouts" for about a year, only to return.

The World War II's call up of Scoutmasters and youth evacuations reduced the BBS to 8 Troops. This decrease continued into the 1950s when only 6 Troops existed; 1st Lewisham (St Stephen's) Loampit Hill (under Charles A Brown, Assistant Chief Commissioner), 1st Wimbledon (Samuel Manning, Grand Scoutmaster) 1st Cirencester (Pooley, Chief Commissioner), 1st Stroud (Pooley, Chief Commissioner), 1st Beckingham, and 1st Huddersfield.  By 1971, Brown was Chief Commissioner and led the lone BBS Troop in Lewisham, South London.

British Boy Scouts (1979–2009)
The St Stephens House Rover Crew in Oxford, led by Michael Foster, joined the BBS in 1979. The Oxford Rover Crew became officially "The Oxford University Rover Crew", With members leaving Oxford and settling elsewhere, this resulted in additional BBS groups in the 1980s.  In 1983, the Reverend Michael Foster (who by that time was a Parish Priest in the Church of England, Vicar of Holy Trinity Clifton, Nottingham) was appointed Chief Commissioner by Charles Brown, who went on to become Grand Scoutmaster. Other groups joined up with the British Boy Scouts: in 1985, 1st Waltham Forest, an Independent Scout Group, and in 1988 the Outlanders association. Several Troops which left the Baden-Powell Scouts' Association under the Banner of the Ex Deputy Area commission Ray O'Donnell-Hampton. joined up with the BBS in 1990s.

The re-expansion of the Order of World Scouts began in the early 1980s with membership in the USA State of Hawaii, and then in 1990s with appointments of a BBS Commissioner for Australia in 1991 and a Chief Commissioner of BBS & BGS in Canada in 1999.

In January 1993, Ted Scott, a friend of Pooley and long time BBS member, became the Grand Scoutmaster following the death of Charles Brown in November 1992 and served seven years becoming the first Grand Scout Emeritus when Dr Michael Foster replaced him. Ted Scott died after being ill on 3 March 2009, after serving 83 years in the BBS. David Cooksley replaced Dr Michael Foster as the Chief Commissioner.

British Girl Scouts
Girls Scouts were a part of the British Boy Scouts from the start.  With a public outcry over girls in the Scouts, the British Boy Scouts launched the British Girl's Nursing Corps (BGNC) under a Scout mistress reporting to the BBS executive and becoming a separate organisation with a journal ("The British Girl Nurse") in June 1910.  Vane however had other ideas and allowed girls to continue as Girl Scouts and brought whole Troops of girls with him from The Boy Scout Association.  Many Girls Scouts did not wish to become Guides under the BSA scheme.  Both the British Girl Scouts and the British Girl's Nursing Corps became members of the Order of World Scouts. The latter was disassociated from the British Boy Scouts and the British Girl Scouts remain as their counterpart.

British Boy Scouts in Australia

Chums Scout Patrols started forming in 1908 in Australia due to the circulation there of the Chums publication for boys. Troops under the British Boy Scouts (BBS) program began operations in 1909. In 1910, Chums Scout Patrols merged with the BBS.  Australia activities continued until the 1930s while members continued to exist in the organisation. The Independent Australian Scouts, a new organisation was found in 1986 and became affiliate and successor to British Boy Scouts in Australia. Several Scoutmasters joined the BBS from The Boy Scouts Association Queensland Branch with an attempt at reconciliation in 1911.   A single Brisbane troop existed there until after 1921.

British Boy Scouts in South Africa

E. P. Carter turned his Boys Guides' Brigade, founded in 1902 into the South African (SA) British Boy Scouts (BBS). The Boys Guide Brigade was found by Carter in 1902.  With the turmoil after 1912, the SA BBS rebuffed Baden-Powell's effort to have them join The Boy Scout Association instead renaming themselves Naval Cadets.

Elsewhere
The British Boy Scouts were also organised in Canada, New Zealand, India, Creillos, South America and Egypt.  All of these were original members of the Order of World Scouts.  Most lost most or all of their members during the First World War. The British Boy Scouts was reintroduced into New Zealand During September 2015.

Chums Scout Patrols

Chums Scout Patrols (also Chums Legion of Scouts or Chums League of Scouts) were an early organisation of Scouting in the United Kingdom. It was formed by the readers of the Chums boys' newspaper, in response to an invite from the Editor for boys to form their own patrols.

History
Chums "On the Watch Tower" news column reported on 11 September 1907 that Robert Baden-Powell's Brownsea Island Scouting encampment was proposed and his recommendation that Boy Scout groups should be formed.  Readers were interested in forming Scouting groups and the editor staff initially support this move, indicate that Baden-Powell would be consulted, and that Chums Scouts should wear the 'Chums' League badge. The Chums newspaper reach in the British Empire and thus Chums Scout Patrols formed in Australia in 1908. With Baden-Powell arrangement with his publisher, Pearson, Chums was denied the rights to publish the Scout scheme in what was a rival paper.  Later, Chums indicated that there would be a Chums Legion of Scouts formed from the Chums Scout Patrols to be announced later.  Instead Chums announced the launch of British Boy Scouts (BBS) and that it would be the official BBS journal in May 1909.

See also
 Order of World Scouts
 Sir Francis Vane
 Chums (paper)

References

External links
 The British Boy Scout and British Girl Scouts Official Website
 The Order of World Scouts BBS page

Non-aligned Scouting organizations
Scouting and Guiding in the United Kingdom
Youth organizations established in 1909
1909 establishments in the United Kingdom